is a Japanese company with its business focused on production, planning and management for anime.

History
The company was founded in March 2015 by ex-Genco producer Nobuhiro Osawa with the objective of being a production and planning company for anime.

In July 2016, the company announced that it was collaborating with light novel author Reki Kawahara, anime scriptwriter Ichiro Okouchi, and anime director Akiyuki Shinbo to expand the company business for planning, production and animating anime projects. It also joined forces with Straight Edge of Kazuma Miki, Kadokawa's former Dengeki Bunko Editor-in-Chief. Due to the collaboration, Kawahara, Okouchi, and Shinbo all became shareholders of Egg Firm.

Works

Television series
Is It Wrong to Try to Pick Up Girls in a Dungeon? (2015–2023) – Production Cooperation
Gate (2015) – Production Cooperation
Shimoneta (2015) – Production Cooperation
Prison School (2015) – Production Cooperation
The Disastrous Life of Saiki K. (2016–2019) – Production
Schoolgirl Strikers: Animation Channel (2017) – Production
Rin-ne (2017) – Production Cooperation
Is It Wrong to Try to Pick Up Girls in a Dungeon? On the Side: Sword Oratoria (2017) – Production Cooperation
Knight's & Magic (2017) – Production Cooperation
UQ Holder! (2017) – Production
Kino's Journey (2017) – Production
Konohana Kitan (2017) – Production Cooperation
Last Period (2018) – Production
Sword Art Online Alternative: Gun Gale Online (2018) – Production
Sword Art Online: Alicization (2018–2020) – Production
Endro! (2019) – Production
No Guns Life (2019–2020) – Production
Kandagawa Jet Girls (2019) – Production
Mushoku Tensei: Jobless Reincarnation (2021) – Production
Rumble Garanndoll (2021) – Production
The Executioner and Her Way of Life (2022) – Production
Immoral Guild (2022) – Production
Onimai: I'm Now Your Sister! (2023) – Production
My Love Story with Yamada-kun at Lv999 (2023) – Production 
World Dai Star (2023) – Production

Films
Accel World: Infinite Burst (2016) – Production Cooperation
Sword Art Online The Movie: Ordinal Scale (2017) – Production Cooperation
Is It Wrong to Try to Pick Up Girls in a Dungeon?: Arrow of the Orion (2019) – Production

References

External links

  
 

Japanese companies established in 2015
Mass media companies established in 2015
Anime companies